Liverpool City Council elections will be held every four years from 2023. Between 1973 and 2021 elections were generally held three years out of every four, with a third of the council being elected each time. Liverpool City Council is the local authority for the metropolitan borough of Liverpool in Merseyside, England. Since the last boundary changes in 2004, 90 councillors have been elected from 30 wards. New ward boundaries are being prepared to take effect from the 2023 election.

Liverpool City Council has existed since 1880, when Liverpool was awarded city status. Prior to this date the local authority was a town council.

Political control

Municipal Borough 1835-1889
Prior to 1835, Liverpool was an ancient borough, with its council appointed under the terms of various charters dating back to 1207. Under the Municipal Corporations Act 1835, boroughs across the country were standardised to become municipal boroughs governed by a corporation, also called the town council. Elections were held every year for one third of the council and the term of office for councillors was three years. The municipal borough of Liverpool also held city status from 1880, allowing the corporation to call itself Liverpool City Council. Political control of the municipal borough was held by the following parties:

County Borough 1889-1973
When elected county councils were established in 1889, Liverpool was made a county borough (whilst retaining its city status), making it administratively independent from Lancashire County Council, although the city remained part of Lancashire for ceremonial purposes. Political control of the city council whilst it was a county borough was held by the following parties:

Metropolitan Borough 1973-
Liverpool became a metropolitan borough (with city status) under the Local Government Act 1972 and was transferred to the new metropolitan county of Merseyside, with Merseyside County Council providing county-level services. The first elections to the reformed city council were held in 1973. The first elections to Merseyside County Council were held in 1973, initially operating as a shadow authority before the revised arrangements took effect on 1 April 1974. Merseyside County Council was abolished in 1986 and Liverpool became a unitary authority. Political control of the council since 1974 has been held by the following parties:

Leadership

Council meetings are chaired by the Lord Mayor of Liverpool, a post which is largely ceremonial. Political leadership on the city council since 2012 has been provided by the similarly named but separate role of the directly elected Mayor of Liverpool. Prior to 2012, political leadership was provided by the leader of the council. The city council has voted to abolish the directly elected mayor position at the end of the current mayor's term of office in 2023 and return to having a leader of the council.

The leaders of the council from 1918 to 2012 were:

County Borough leaders

The last leader of the council before the 1974 reforms, Bill Sefton, went on to be the first leader of Merseyside County Council.

Metropolitan Borough leaders

Directly elected mayors

‡ Joe Anderson was suspended from the Labour Party and stood aside from his mayoral role in December 2020. He remained nominally the mayor until the end of his term of office in May 2021, but the deputy mayor, Wendy Simon, served as acting mayor during that period.

Council elections
Elections following the grant of city status to Liverpool on 12 May 1880:

Municipal Borough

1880
1881
1882
1883
1884
1885
1886
1887
1888

County Borough

1889
1890
1891
1892
1893
1894
1895
1896
1897
1898
1899
1900
1901
1902
1903
1904
1905
1906
1907
1908
1909
1910
1911
1912
1913
1914
1918
1919
1920
1921
1922
1923
1924
1925
1926 
1927
1928
1929
1930
1931
1932
1933
1934
1935
1936
1937
1938
1945
1946
1947
1949
1950
1951
1952
1953
1954
1955
1956
1957
1958
1959
1960
1961
1962
1963
1964
1965
1966
1967
1968
1969
1970
1971
1972

Metropolitan Borough

1973 Boundary changes reduce the number of wards from 40 to 33, aldermen abolished.
1975
1976
1978
1979
1980 Whole council elected after boundary changes
1982
1983
1984
1986
1987
1988
1990
1991
1992
1994
1995
1996
1998
1999
2000
2002
2003
2004 Boundary changes reduce the number of seats by 9 to 90 
2006
2007
2008
2010
2011
2012
2014
2015
2016
2018
2019
2021 (postponed from 2020 due to COVID-19 pandemic)
2023 Boundary changes establish 3 three member ward, 15 two member wards and 46 single member wards, reducing the number of councillors from 90 to 85 with all-up elections every four years.

See also
 Liverpool
 Liverpool City Council
 Liverpool Town Council elections 1835 - 1879
 Liverpool School Board elections 1870–1900
 Directly elected mayor of Liverpool - 2012–2023
 Merseyside County Council 1974–1986
 Mayors and Lord Mayors of Liverpool 1207 to present
 List of electoral wards in Merseyside

References

By-election results

External links
Liverpool City Council

 
Elections
Council elections in Merseyside
Elections in Liverpool